Monastic state may refer to:

 Monastic community of Mount Athos
 Monastic State of the Teutonic Order
 Monastic State of the Livonian Order
 Monastic State of the Knights Hospitaller

See also
 Abbatial states of the Holy Roman Empire
 State (disambiguation)